Jane Hooper-Perroud (born c. 1962) (also known as Jane Hooper Perroud) is a Canadian curler from Bradford, Ontario.

Teams and events

Private life
Hooper-Perroud  is married to fellow curler Canadian curler Pat Perroud, who won Canadian and World championships with Al Hackner and Ed Werenich.

References

External links
 
 
 Jane Hooper Perroud – Curling Canada Stats Archive
 Jane Hooper-Perroud Pictures | Getty Images
 A story of resilience at the 2019 Everest Senior Curling Championships | Curling Canada

Living people
Canadian women curlers
Curlers from Ontario
World curling champions
Canadian women's curling champions
People from Simcoe County
1960s births